General elections were held for the first time in Singapore on 20 March 1948, when six of the 22 seats on the Legislative Council became directly-elected. 

Voting was not compulsory and was restricted to British subjects with residency or were born in Singapore. Around 2.4% (~23,000) of the total population of 940,000 voted in the election. 

Although various organisations called for a boycott of the elections, voter turnout was 63.1%. The Progressive Party (PP) was the only contesting party, winning three of the six elected seats.

Background
The election was announced on 1 February, and nominations were due by 16 February. The campaign period lasted for 31 days. Polling was scheduled on 20 March 1948 and the First Legislative Council had its first session on 1 April 1948.

In this election there were 4 constituencies: Municipal North-East, Municipal South-West, Rural East and Rural West. Municipal North-East and Municipal South-West elected 2 members each. 

Singapore would not have multi-seat constituencies until 1988 and is the last time that multi-seat constituencies had their candidates chosen individually (as in 1988 when the GRC was introduced, the party with the most votes had their members elected en masse rather than the votes received by the candidates individually).

Electoral system
Of the 22 seats in the Legislative Council, six were elected, three nominated by commercial organisations (the Singapore Chamber of Commerce, Chinese Chamber of Commerce and Indian Chamber of Commerce), and thirteen appointed by the British authorities; these included the Governor, Colonial Secretary, Financial Secretary, Attorney-General, Solicitor-General, two Directors, two ex officio Commissioners and four non-officio ones.

The six elected seats were elected from four constituencies; two two-seat constituencies and two single-member constituencies. Parties had no fixed standard symbol and candidates had to ballot for one offered by the elections office.

Results

By constituency
Rural West Constituency saw the highest voter turnout at 73.40% while Rural East Constituency saw the lowest turnout at 54.68%. In percentage terms, Sardon bin Jubir (the independent candidate who stood in Rural East) was the highest scoring candidate polling 54.93% of the vote while Progressive Party candidate Lim Chuan Geok who stood in Municipal North-East was the worst performing candidate by polling just 8.14% of the votes. In absolute numbers, Progressive Party leader Tan Chye Cheng who stood in Municipal South-West was the best performing candidate by polling 4,125 votes while Arumugam Ponnu Rajah of the Progressive Party who stood in Rural West was the worst performing candidate with just 460 votes. 

The narrowest margin of victory was that of Tan Chye Cheng who polled just 0.7% more than his own party's second candidate Nazir Ahmad Mallal (but both were elected as Members of Municipal South West as the constituency elected 2 members who polled the first and second most votes). 3 candidates lost their $500 electoral deposits: Lim Chuan Geok, Valiya Purayil Pillai and Richard Lim Chuan Hoe. All 3 candidates were candidates contesting Municipal North-East Constituency. 

Only 2 candidates managed to poll a majority of the valid votes in their respective constituencies: Sirish Chandra Goho of Rural West (50.03%) and Sardon bin Jubir of Rural East (54.93%). PP's candidate Christopher John Laycock won with the narrowest margin of votes; polling just 5.48% over the third candidate in Municipal North-East whereas Tan Chye Cheng won with the largest margin of 26.18% over the third candidate in Municipal South-West.

See also
List of Singaporean electoral divisions (1948–51)

References

British rule in Singapore
Singapore
General
General elections in Singapore